Ran-specific binding protein 1 is an enzyme that in humans is encoded by the RANBP1 gene.

Ran/TC4-binding protein, RanBP1, interacts specifically with GTP-charged RAN. RANBP1 encodes a 23-kD protein that binds to RAN complexed with GTP but not GDP. RANBP1 does not activate GTPase activity of RAN but does markedly increase GTP hydrolysis by the RanGTPase-activating protein (RANGAP1). The RANBP1 cDNA encodes a 201-amino acid protein that is 92% similar to its mouse homolog. In both mammalian cells and in yeast, RANBP1 acts as a negative regulator of RCC1 by inhibiting RCC1-stimulated guanine nucleotide release from RAN.

Interactions
RANBP1 has been shown to interact with XPO1, KPNB1 and Ran.

References

Further reading